mflow was an online social music streaming, recommendation and mp3-retailing service. It allowed users to search, stream, and recommend music free of charge.

Company background

History 

Founded in 2008, mflow was a social music sharing and downloading service, developed by Digital Distribution Networks in London.

The service was first launched as a limited beta, open only to invited users in December 2009.  The first iteration of the service was a software client that ran on users' machines.  In August 2010, mflow started developing an HTML5 based internet application.  On December 3, 2010, mflow launched the first beta version of their web based service with an expanded feature list.

Music sales and rewards system 

Uniquely, mflow rewarded users for recommending music.  20% of the retail price of tracks and albums sold on mflow were redistributed back to the recommending user(s) as “mflow credits”.

Catalogue 

As of January 2011, mflow had a catalogue of approximately five million tracks. Label partners included: Universal, Sony, PIAS, Beggars, Ingrooves, Skint Records, Domino Recordings, Ministry of Sound, IODA and many more.

Closure 

As of January 2012 the site was closed for business.  A message on the company's home page stated: "Over the past few months we've been working on a top-secret new project... we can't share this grown-up mflow with you until we're confident it's better than anything you've used before." It was later revealed the site would be closed for good to make way for a new mobile streaming app titled Bloom.fm.

Directed by Thong Nguyen and Oleg Fomenko, the company posted public accounts in 2010 recording total liabilities of £7.6 million, and -£5.4M in net assets.

References

British music websites
British social networking websites